The men's 10 metre platform diving competition at the 2016 Olympic Games in Rio de Janeiro took place on 19 and 20 August at the Maria Lenk Aquatic Center within the Olympic Park.

The competition comprised three rounds:

Preliminary round: All divers performed six dives; the top 18 divers advanced to the semi-final.
Semi-final: The 18 divers performed six dives; the scores of the preliminaries were erased and the top 12 divers advanced to the final.
Final: The 12 divers performed six dives; the semi-final scores were erased and the top three divers won the gold, silver and bronze medals accordingly.

Schedule 
All times are Brasília time (UTC-3)

Results

References

Diving at the 2016 Summer Olympics
2016
Men's events at the 2016 Summer Olympics